Dominik Radziwiłł may refer to:

Dominik Mikołaj Radziwiłł (1643–1697), Polish nobleman and politician
Dominik Hieronim Radziwiłł (1786–1813), Polish nobleman and colonel in the Polish Army
Dominik Rainer Radziwiłł (1911-1976), Polish military officer and husband of Princess Eugénie of Greece and Denmark